Bufoceratias shaoi is a species of double angler, a type of anglerfish. It has been found in the western Indian Ocean and western Pacific Ocean. It was first described in 2004 by Theodore Pietsch, Ho Hsuan-Ching & Chen Hong-Ming.

References

Diceratiidae
Deep sea fish
Fish described in 2004
Taxa named by Theodore Wells Pietsch III